Crystal Theatre is a historic theater in Elko, Nevada. It is located at 676 Commercial Street. It is now known as the Crystal 5 and is part of UEC Theatres. The theater was part of a Nevada Supreme Court case in the 1970s.

References

Elko, Nevada
Theatres in Nevada